INS Sharabh was a  of the Indian Navy

It also regularly participated in multinational exercises like MILAN, CORPAT, SIMBEX and PASSEX. In her final year of commission the ship completed almost 100 days at sea and participated in India-Indonesian Coordinated Patrol (CORPAT) at Belawan, Indonesia and the subsequent Passing Exercise (PASEX) in November 2010.

In recognition to her indomitable spirit and devotion, the ship was awarded the coveted "Unit Citation" by Chief of the Naval Staff in 2003.

INS Sharabh was commissioned in the Indian Navy in January 1976 at Gdynia, Poland. It was the fourth in the series of Landing Ship Tanks bought by the Indian Navy.

Lieutenant Commander P C B Nair was the commissioning commanding officer of the ship and since was commanded subsequently by 28 officers in 35 years of commissioned service. The commissioning executive officer was Lt. Lalit Kumar.

Commander Sanjay Kumar was the last officer to command the ship.

The ship was also instrumental in apprehension of prohibited items off Tilanchang Island from Mynamarese poachers in January this year.

See also
 Ships of the Indian Navy

References

 http://www.thehindu.com/news/national/article2230907.ece

Kumbhir-class tank landing ships
Ships built in Gdańsk